Aphonopelma eutylenum, commonly called California ebony tarantula, is a species of spider in the family Theraphosidae, found in the United States (California).

Description

The body of the California ebony tarantula comes in various brown tones, ranging from light beige to dark brown and ebony colors. Adult females can reach a legspan of up to 13 cm (5 inches) and live up to 25 years of age. The male reaches maturity after 8–12 years and leave its burrow after that in search for a mate. After spending all its energy on finding a suitable partner, he will die of exhaustion after around 6 months after reaching adulthood.

References

eutylenum
Spiders of the United States
Spiders described in 1940